Deborah Henson-Conant (born November 11, 1953 in Stockton, California) is an American harpist and composer.  Nicknamed "the Hip Harpist", she is known for her flamboyant stage presence and her innovation with electric harps.

Career
Deborah Henson-Conant describes her music as "cross-genre: jazz-pop-comedy-folk-blues-flamenco-celtic". Deborah performs one-person shows in theaters, concert halls and festivals; and she does original music and theatre shows with symphony orchestras.  Her performances mix music with theatrical and story elements. She orchestrates all her own music when she plays with symphony and often engages symphonic musicians in unexpected ways.  She states that her career objectives include a desire to reevaluate misconceptions and underestimations of the harp instrument, of the stage medium, and of the self.

The soundtrack of her 2006 DVD Invention & Alchemy, received a Grammy nomination, and the video version began broadcast on American public television in 2007. Her performance series Inviting Invention (2006) presents a series of "performance explorations" that includes both musical and non-musical guests collaborating onstage with Henson-Conant.

In 2012, she joined Steve Vai's band for his 2012 tour and album, The Story of Light. In October 2013, Henson-Conant performed and represented the United States at the 7th annual World Harp Festival, in Asunción, Paraguay.

Discography

Albums
The Story of Light (2012)
Invention and Alchemy (2006)
Artists Proof Ltd Edition Version 2.1 (2004)
The Frog Princess (2000)
Live Wires (with Livingston Taylor) (2000)
The Celtic Album (1998)
Altered Ego (1998)
Just for You (1995)
The Gift (1995)
'Round the Corner (1993)
Naked Music (1994)
Budapest (1992)
Talking Hands (1991)
Caught in the Act (1990)
On the Rise (1989)
Songs My Mother Sang (1985)

Compilation appearances
New Age Music & New Sounds Vol. 67 - "Liberty"

Videography
Invention and Alchemy (2006)

Reception
The soundtrack of her 2006 DVD Invention & Alchemy, received a Grammy nomination. The Daily News Online said that she has a "harp show like none other", featuring her "big, brassy voice".

Instruments
Henson-Conant plays electric harps of various kinds, but primarily plays Camac Harps. The Camac DHC Light Blue electric harp was named after her.
Small Rubarth "R-Harp" (a lap harp)
Lyon & Healy Style 2000 Electroacoustic
Camac Electro-acoustic Big Blue
Camac Baby Blue
Lyon & Healy Silhouette

References

External links

Invention & Alchemy DVD & CD Project Website

Living people
1953 births
Musicians from Stockton, California
People from Arlington, Massachusetts
20th-century American composers
21st-century American composers
American harpists
American performance artists
Writers from Stockton, California